The women's 500 metres races of the 2013–14 ISU Speed Skating World Cup 6, arranged in the Thialf arena, in Heerenveen, Netherlands, was held on 15 and 16 March 2014.

Olga Fatkulina of Russia won both the Saturday and the Sunday race. On Saturday, Heather Richardson of the United States came second, while Nao Kodaira of Japan came third.

On Sunday, Jenny Wolf of Germany came second, and Richardson lost one place down to third.

Race 1
Race one took place on Saturday, 15 March, scheduled at 16:18.

Division A

Race 2
Race two took place on Sunday, 16 March, scheduled at 13:30.

Division A

References

Women 0500
6